is Japanese singer-songwriter miwa's fourth major label single, released on December 1, 2010.

Track listing

Chart rankings

Reported sales

References 

Miwa (singer) songs
2010 singles
Japanese-language songs
Songs written by miwa (singer)
2010 songs